Jack Lang may refer to:
Jack Lang (French politician) (born 1939), French social democratic politician
Jack Lang (Australian politician) (1876–1975), twice Premier of New South Wales
Jack Lang (American football), former American football player
Jack Lang (sportswriter) (1921–2007), American sportswriter
Jack Lang, co-founder of the Raspberry Pi Foundation

See also
John Lang (disambiguation)